Jaynie is a given name. Notable people with the name include:

 Jaynie Krick (1929–2014), American baseball pitcher and utility infielder
 Jaynie Parkhouse (born 1956), New Zealand freestyle swimmer
 Jaynie Seal (born 1973), Australian television presenter

See also

 Jane (given name)
 Jayne
 Janie (given name)
 Jaynee
 Janee
 Jana (given name)
 Jayna
 Janey

English feminine given names